Iris Macfarlane (22 July 1922 – 12 February 2007) was a British writer.

Her memoir, Daughters of the Empire: A Memoir of Life and Times in the British Raj covers her life as the wife of a wealthy tea planter in Assam in northeast British India. With her son, the noted anthropologist and historian Alan Macfarlane, she wrote The Empire of Tea (2004), a history of tea.

In 1976, Macfarlane published The Mouth of the Night, a collection of tales from the Popular Tales of the West Highlands translated from Gaelic. She also wrote on historical topics in History Today during the 1960s and 70s.

References

External links

1922 births
2007 deaths
British women historians
20th-century British historians
British people in colonial India